Terra de Celanova is a comarca in the Galician Ourense. The overall population of this  local region is 17,497 (2019).

Municipalities
A Bola, Cartelle, Celanova, Gomesende, A Merca, Padrenda, Pontedeva, Quintela de Leirado, Ramirás and Verea.

References 

Comarcas of the Province of Ourense